Andria is an Italian city in the Province of Barletta-Andria-Trani.

Andria may also refer to:

Literature
Andria (comedy) or The Girl from Andros, a Roman comedy by Terence
Andria (Machiavelli), a play by Niccolò Machiavelli, translated from Terence's

Other uses
Alfonso Andria, (born 1952), an Italian politician
Roman Catholic Diocese of Andria, a Roman Catholic diocese
"Andria", a song by La Dispute from their 2008 album Somewhere at the Bottom of the River Between Vega and Altair

See also
Andrea (disambiguation)